The Doppler effect or Doppler shift (or simply Doppler, when in context) is the apparent change in frequency of a wave in relation to an observer moving relative to the wave source. It is named after the Austrian physicist Christian Doppler, who described the phenomenon in 1842.

A common example of Doppler shift is the change of pitch heard when a vehicle sounding a horn approaches and recedes from an observer. Compared to the emitted frequency, the received frequency is higher during the approach, identical at the instant of passing by, and lower during the recession.

The reason for the Doppler effect is that when the source of the waves is moving towards the observer, each successive wave crest is emitted from a position closer to the observer than the crest of the previous wave.  Therefore, each wave takes slightly less time to reach the observer than the previous wave. Hence, the time between the arrivals of successive wave crests at the observer is reduced, causing an increase in the frequency. While they are traveling, the distance between successive wave fronts is reduced, so the waves "bunch together".  Conversely, if the source of waves is moving away from the observer, each wave is emitted from a position farther from the observer than the previous wave, so the arrival time between successive waves is increased, reducing the frequency. The distance between successive wave fronts is then increased, so the waves "spread out". 

For waves that propagate in a medium, such as sound waves, the velocity of the observer and of the source are relative to the medium in which the waves are transmitted. The total Doppler effect may therefore result from motion of the source, motion of the observer, motion of the medium, or any combination thereof. For waves propagating in vacuum, such as electromagnetic waves or gravitational waves, only the difference in velocity between the observer and the source needs to be considered. If this relative speed is not negligible compared to the speed of light, a more complicated relativistic Doppler effect arises.

History

Doppler first proposed this effect in 1842 in his treatise "Über das farbige Licht der Doppelsterne und einiger anderer Gestirne des Himmels" (On the coloured light of the binary stars and some other stars of the heavens). The hypothesis was tested for sound waves by Buys Ballot in 1845. He confirmed that the sound's pitch was higher than the emitted frequency when the sound source approached him, and lower than the emitted frequency when the sound source receded from him. Hippolyte Fizeau discovered independently the same phenomenon on electromagnetic waves in 1848 (in France, the effect is sometimes called "effet Doppler-Fizeau" but that name was not adopted by the rest of the world as Fizeau's discovery was six years after Doppler's proposal). In Britain, John Scott Russell made an experimental study of the Doppler effect (1848).

General

In classical physics, where the speeds of source and the receiver relative to the medium are lower than the speed of waves in the medium, the relationship between observed frequency  and emitted frequency  is given by:

where
 is the propagation speed of waves in the medium;
 is the speed of the receiver relative to the medium, added to  if the receiver is moving towards the source, subtracted if the receiver is moving away from the source;
 is the speed of the source relative to the medium, added to  if the source is moving away from the receiver, subtracted if the source is moving towards the receiver.

Note this relationship predicts that the frequency will decrease if either source or receiver is moving away from the other.

Equivalently, under the assumption that the source is either directly approaching or receding from the observer:

where 
 is the wave's speed relative to the receiver;
 is the wave's speed relative to the source;
 is the wavelength.

If the source approaches the observer at an angle (but still with a constant speed), the observed frequency that is first heard is higher than the object's emitted frequency. Thereafter, there is a monotonic decrease in the observed frequency as it gets closer to the observer, through equality when it is coming from a direction perpendicular to the relative motion (and was emitted at the point of closest approach; but when the wave is received, the source and observer will no longer be at their closest), and a continued monotonic decrease as it recedes from the observer. When the observer is very close to the path of the object, the transition from high to low frequency is very abrupt. When the observer is far from the path of the object, the transition from high to low frequency is gradual.

where

 is the opposite of the relative speed of the receiver with respect to the source: it is positive when the source and the receiver are moving towards each other.

Consequences
With an observer stationary relative to the medium, if a moving source is emitting waves with an actual frequency  (in this case, the wavelength is changed, the transmission velocity of the wave keeps constant; note that the transmission velocity of the wave does not depend on the velocity of the source), then the observer detects waves with a frequency  given by

A similar analysis for a moving observer and a stationary source (in this case, the wavelength keeps constant, but due to the motion, the rate at which the observer receives waves and hence the transmission velocity of the wave [with respect to the observer] is changed) yields the observed frequency:

Assuming a stationary observer and a source moving at the speed of sound, the Doppler equation predicts a perceived momentary infinite frequency by an observer in front of a source that is traveling at the speed of sound. All the peaks are at the same place, so the wavelength is zero and the frequency is infinite. This overlay of all the waves produces a shock wave which for sound waves is known as a sonic boom.

When the source moves faster than the wave speed the source outruns the wave. The equation gives negative frequency values, which have no physical sense in this context (no sound at all will be heard by the observer until the source passes past them).

Lord Rayleigh predicted the following effect in his classic book on sound: if the observer were moving from the (stationary) source at twice the speed of sound, a musical piece previously emitted by that source would be heard in correct tempo and pitch, but as if played backwards.

Applications

Acoustic Doppler current profiler
An acoustic Doppler current profiler (ADCP) is a hydroacoustic current meter similar to a sonar, used to measure water current velocities over a depth range using the Doppler effect of sound waves scattered back from particles within the water column. The term ADCP is a generic term for all acoustic current profilers, although the abbreviation originates from an instrument series introduced by RD Instruments in the 1980s.  The working frequencies range of ADCPs range from 38 kHz to several Megahertz. The device used in the air for wind speed profiling using sound is known as SODAR and works with the same underlying principles.

Robotics
Dynamic real-time path planning in robotics to aid the movement of robots in a sophisticated environment with moving obstacles often take help of Doppler effect. Such applications are specially used for competitive robotics where the environment is constantly changing, such as robosoccer.

Sirens

A siren on a passing emergency vehicle will start out higher than its stationary pitch, slide down as it passes, and continue lower than its stationary pitch as it recedes from the observer. Astronomer John Dobson explained the effect thus:

In other words, if the siren approached the observer directly, the pitch would remain constant, at a higher than stationary pitch, until the vehicle hit him, and then immediately jump to a new lower pitch. Because the vehicle passes by the observer, the radial speed does not remain constant, but instead varies as a function of the angle between his line of sight and the siren's velocity:

where  is the angle between the object's forward velocity and the line of sight from the object to the observer.

Astronomy

The Doppler effect for electromagnetic waves such as light is of widespread use in astronomy to measure the speed at which stars and galaxies are approaching or receding from us, resulting in so called blueshift or redshift, respectively. This may be used to detect if an apparently single star is, in reality, a close binary, to measure the rotational speed of stars and galaxies, or to detect exoplanets. This effect typically happens on a very small scale; there would not be a noticeable difference in visible light to the unaided eye.
The use of the Doppler effect in astronomy depends on knowledge of precise frequencies of discrete lines in the spectra of stars.

Among the nearby stars, the largest radial velocities with respect to the Sun are +308 km/s (BD-15°4041, also known as LHS 52, 81.7 light-years away) and −260 km/s (Woolley 9722, also known as Wolf 1106 and LHS 64, 78.2 light-years away). Positive radial speed means the star is receding from the Sun, negative that it is approaching.

Redshift is also used to measure the expansion of space, but this is not truly a Doppler effect. Rather, redshifting due to the expansion of space is known as cosmological redshift, which can be derived purely from the Robertson-Walker metric under the formalism of general relativity. Having said this, it also happens that there are detectable Doppler effects on cosmological scales, which, if incorrectly interpreted as cosmological in origin, lead to the observation of redshift-space distortions.

Radar

The Doppler effect is used in some types of radar, to measure the velocity of detected objects. A radar beam is fired at a moving target — e.g. a motor car, as police use radar to detect speeding motorists — as it approaches or recedes from the radar source. Each successive radar wave has to travel farther to reach the car, before being reflected and re-detected near the source. As each wave has to move farther, the gap between each wave increases, increasing the wavelength. In some situations, the radar beam is fired at the moving car as it approaches, in which case each successive wave travels a lesser distance, decreasing the wavelength. In either situation, calculations from the Doppler effect accurately determine the car's speed. Moreover, the proximity fuze, developed during World War II, relies upon Doppler radar to detonate explosives at the correct time, height, distance, etc.

Because the Doppler shift affects the wave incident upon the target as well as the wave reflected back to the radar, the change in frequency observed by a radar due to a target moving at relative speed  is twice that from the same target emitting a wave:

Medical

An echocardiogram can, within certain limits, produce an accurate assessment of the direction of blood flow and the velocity of blood and cardiac tissue at any arbitrary point using the Doppler effect. One of the limitations is that the ultrasound beam should be as parallel to the blood flow as possible. Velocity measurements allow assessment of cardiac valve areas and function, abnormal communications between the left and right side of the heart, leaking of blood through the valves (valvular regurgitation), and calculation of the cardiac output. Contrast-enhanced ultrasound using gas-filled microbubble contrast media can be used to improve velocity or other flow-related medical measurements.

Although "Doppler" has become synonymous with "velocity measurement" in medical imaging, in many cases it is not the frequency shift (Doppler shift) of the received signal that is measured, but the phase shift (when the received signal arrives).

Velocity measurements of blood flow are also used in other fields of medical ultrasonography, such as obstetric ultrasonography and neurology. Velocity measurement of blood flow in arteries and veins based on Doppler effect is an effective tool for diagnosis of vascular problems like stenosis.

Flow measurement
Instruments such as the laser Doppler velocimeter (LDV), and acoustic Doppler velocimeter (ADV) have been developed to measure velocities in a fluid flow. The LDV emits a light beam and the ADV emits an ultrasonic acoustic burst, and measure the Doppler shift in wavelengths of reflections from particles moving with the flow. The actual flow is computed as a function of the water velocity and phase. This technique allows non-intrusive flow measurements, at high precision and high frequency.

Velocity profile measurement
Developed originally for velocity measurements in medical applications (blood flow), Ultrasonic Doppler Velocimetry (UDV) can measure in real time complete velocity profile in almost any liquids containing particles in suspension such as dust, gas bubbles, emulsions. Flows can be pulsating, oscillating, laminar or turbulent, stationary or transient. This technique is fully non-invasive.

Satellites

Satellite navigation

The Doppler shift can be exploited for satellite navigation such as in Transit and DORIS.

Satellite communication

Doppler also needs to be compensated in satellite communication. 
Fast moving satellites can have a Doppler shift of dozens of kilohertz relative to a ground station. The speed, thus magnitude of Doppler effect, changes due to earth curvature. Dynamic Doppler compensation, where the frequency of a signal is changed progressively during transmission, is used so the satellite receives a constant frequency signal. After realizing that the Doppler shift had not been considered before launch of the  Huygens probe of the 2005 Cassini–Huygens mission, the probe trajectory was altered to approach Titan in such a way that its transmissions traveled perpendicular to its direction of motion relative to Cassini, greatly reducing the Doppler shift.

Doppler shift of the direct path can be estimated by the following formula:

The additional Doppler shift due to the satellite moving can be described as:

where  is the relative speed of the satellite.

Audio
The Leslie speaker, most commonly associated with and predominantly used with the famous Hammond organ, takes advantage of the Doppler effect by using an electric motor to rotate an acoustic horn around a loudspeaker, sending its sound in a circle. This results at the listener's ear in rapidly fluctuating frequencies of a keyboard note.

Vibration measurement
A laser Doppler vibrometer (LDV) is a non-contact instrument for measuring vibration. The laser beam from the LDV is directed at the surface of interest, and the vibration amplitude and frequency are extracted from the Doppler shift of the laser beam frequency due to the motion of the surface.

Developmental biology
During the segmentation of vertebrate embryos, waves of gene expression sweep across the presomitic mesoderm, the tissue from which the precursors of the vertebrae (somites) are formed. A new somite is formed upon arrival of a wave at the anterior end of the presomitic mesoderm. In zebrafish, it has been shown that the shortening of the presomitic mesoderm during segmentation leads to a Doppler-like effect as the anterior end of the tissue moves into the waves. This effect contributes to the period of segmentation.

Inverse Doppler effect
Since 1968 scientists such as Victor Veselago have speculated about the possibility of an inverse Doppler effect. The size of the Doppler shift depends on the refractive index of the medium a wave is traveling through. But some materials are capable of negative refraction, which should lead to a Doppler shift that works in a direction opposite that of a conventional Doppler shift. The first experiment that detected this effect was conducted by Nigel Seddon and Trevor Bearpark in Bristol, United Kingdom in 2003. Later, the inverse Doppler effect was observed in some inhomogeneous materials, and predicted inside a Vavilov–Cherenkov cone.

See also

 Bistatic Doppler shift
 Differential Doppler effect
 Doppler cooling
 Dopplergraph
 Fading
 Fizeau experiment
 Photoacoustic Doppler effect
 Range rate
 Rayleigh fading
 Redshift
 Laser Doppler imaging
 Relativistic Doppler effect

Primary sources

References

Further reading
 Doppler, C. (1842). Über das farbige Licht der Doppelsterne und einiger anderer Gestirne des Himmels (About the coloured light of the binary stars and some other stars of the heavens). Publisher: Abhandlungen der Königl. Böhm. Gesellschaft der Wissenschaften (V. Folge, Bd. 2, S. 465–482) [Proceedings of the Royal Bohemian Society of Sciences (Part V, Vol 2)]; Prague: 1842 (Reissued 1903). Some sources mention 1843 as year of publication because in that year the article was published in the Proceedings of the Bohemian Society of Sciences. Doppler himself referred to the publication as "Prag 1842 bei Borrosch und André", because in 1842 he had a preliminary edition printed that he distributed independently.
 "Doppler and the Doppler effect", E. N. da C. Andrade, Endeavour Vol. XVIII No. 69, January 1959 (published by ICI London). Historical account of Doppler's original paper and subsequent developments.
 David Nolte (2020). The fall and rise of the Doppler effect. Physics Today, v. 73, pgs. 31 - 35. DOI: 10.1063/PT.3.4429

External links
 
 Doppler Effect, ScienceWorld

 
Wave mechanics
Radio frequency propagation
Radar signal processing
Sound
Acoustics